Summerfest is an annual music festival held in downtown Milwaukee, Wisconsin. First held in 1968, Summerfest is located at Henry Maier Festival Park, adjacent to Lake Michigan and Milwaukee's central business district. Summerfest attracts approximately 800,000 people each year, promoting itself as "The World's Largest Music Festival", a title certified by Guinness World Records in 1999, but has been surpassed in attendance by Donauinselfest with over 3 million in 2015. While Summerfest has one of the highest aggregate attendances in the world, the daily attendance of Summerfest is lower than other major American music festivals. In 2022, the daily attendance of Summerfest was 49,500.

During Summerfest, the  park would usually host performances over 11 days, from late June until early July (including the Fourth of July). It was announced recently that the festival would move to a three weekend schedule to allow for more Friday and Saturday event days. The performers include local and nationally known music talent from various genres, performing throughout the grounds from noon to midnight, including the 23,000-capacity American Family Insurance Amphitheater. Since 2004, nearly $150 million has been invested into Henry Maier Festival Park, including permanent stages, bars, production space, VIP amenities and other infrastructure.

Summerfest also showcases a wide variety of food from many Milwaukee-area restaurants. Other Summerfest attractions include shopping vendors, fireworks (including "The Big Bang" on opening night), family activities, and more. Summerfest is operated by Milwaukee World Festival, Inc. a non-profit organization, which is governed by a volunteer board of directors.

In its 50+ year history, Summerfest has hosted a variety of well-known artists, including Paul McCartney, the Rolling Stones, Tina Turner, Metallica, Whitney Houston, Stevie Wonder, Kenny Chesney, Aerosmith, Bruno Mars, Lady Gaga, Usher and Dave Matthews Band.

Don Smiley has served as president and chief executive officer of Summerfest since 2004.

History
Summerfest was conceived in the 1960s by then-mayor Henry W. Maier. Inspired by his visit to Oktoberfest in Munich, Germany, Maier envisioned a similar ethnic-themed festival in Milwaukee, and in 1962 formed a panel of business and civic leaders to study the feasibility of a large-scale summer festival. By the middle of the decade, the panel drew up a proposal for a 10-day multi-event festival with the proposed name of "Milwaukee World Festival," which was changed briefly in 1966 to "Juli Spaß" (German for "July Fun") and then to "Summerfest".

The inaugural Summerfest was held in July 1968 at 35 different locations throughout the city (including Milwaukee County Stadium and Milwaukee Arena), and its events ranged from concerts to a film festival, an air show, and even a pageant. The first Summerfest, produced by Dee Robb and Con Merten was regarded as a success; the second event in 1969, was less successful, as it was plagued by additional venues, inclement weather, and severe financial debt.

In 1970, a permanent central location was decided upon, and Summerfest moved to a former Nike missile site on the lakefront, where it continues to be held to this day. Also that year, Summerfest introduced its red "smiley face" logo, an insignia that has become synonymous with the event. The logo was designed by local graphic artists Noel Spangler and Richard D. Grant.

It was also in 1970 that Henry Jordan, former Green Bay Packers defensive tackle, became executive director of Summerfest, a title he held during the event's early years until his death in 1977. After a few other businessmen were hired by the board for the executive director's job, Elizabeth "Bo" Black, who was formerly Henry Jordan's secretary, became executive director in 1984 after a ten-year lobbying effort.

The event has not been without its controversy. On December 9, 2002, Lee Gates commented in the Milwaukee Journal Sentinel about the lack of opportunity to play at Summerfest. "I don't get the credit I deserve here. I've been playing 50-something years. There's discrimination at Summerfest. I shouldn't need to have a CD out to be paid $700 at Summerfest. If they want you to have CDs, they should pay you like they pay the professional people."

Summerfest celebrated its 40th anniversary in 2007. The event's history was the subject of "Summerfest Stories", a documentary that aired in June 2007 on Milwaukee Public Television.

In 2015, Milwaukee World Festival, Inc and ReverbNation announced a three-year agreement to use the online service as an audition to give musicians a chance to perform.  Summerfest wanted to provide an opportunity for performers to get a chance to be one of the 800+ acts and allow new talent to be seen by over 900,000 people that attend.

2020 saw the COVID-19 pandemic as grounds for scrapping the concert part & moving others online.

Attendance

Summerfest Attendance Since 1995

Summerfest attendance peaked in 2001 at 1,000,563 attendees. Summerfest was closed in 2020 due to the COVID-19 pandemic. In 2021, the event was only 9 days instead of 11, and it occurred in September rather than during the summer months.

Stages and other venues
The Summerfest grounds include seven permanent stages and two pavilions that can be converted to stages (Johnson Controls World Sound Stage and the South Pavilion).

Concert history year by year
Summerfest has been most famous for its music since the first festival in 1968, when acts such as Ronnie Dove, The New Colony Six, The Robbs and Up With People performed. Since then, musical acts from Bob Dylan, The Jackson 5, Frank Sinatra, Prince,  Whitney Houston, The Jonas Brothers, Fleetwood Mac, Maroon 5, Fun, Britney Spears, Stevie Ray Vaughan, Cher, Tina Turner, and James Taylor to Christina Aguilera, Diana Ross, Roy Orbison, Liza Minnelli, Kanye West, Kid Cudi, Stevie Wonder, Mary J. Blige, Wiz Khalifa, Imagine Dragons, Nine Inch Nails, The Ramones, Billie Eilish, Willie Nelson, The Rolling Stones, and Paul McCartney have graced the Summerfest stages. Acts with Milwaukee and Wisconsin connections have had a prominent history at Summerfest, most notably  the BoDeans, The Gufs, Danny Gokey, and Violent Femmes.

The concerts have been mostly civil events, with two notable exceptions. In 1970, a performance by the late-arriving Sly & the Family Stone nearly resulted in a riot. In 1973, a performance by Humble Pie & Jo Jo Gunne resulted in a riot, a bonfire, and about 300 arrests. As a result of the latter concert, organizers shied away from rock bands for several years, and established guidelines for "family-friendly" acts and a ban on alcohol brought in by patrons. This was properly managed when Henry Jordan found the experienced managers: Joel Gast and Lou Volpano, to manage entertainment in-house, eliminating Cleveland's Jules Belkin Promotions, who were hired by Board Members Bernie Samson and Steve Marcus. Also at that time local manager Volpano was hired specifically to improve production and book international superstars on what was a mere Local Rock Stage, where then the Ramones, UFO, and Judas Priest headlined 

Live comedy acts have also been a part of Summerfest's history, even before a regular "Comedy Showcase" was first established in 1975. Bob Hope was the main headliner at Summerfest 1969, performing two shows at Milwaukee County Stadium.  George Carlin (opening for Arlo Guthrie) performed his "Seven Words You Can Never Say on Television" routine at the 1972 event and was subsequently arrested for violating obscenity laws. Prior to his arrest, he discarded a bag of cocaine to avoid further imprisonment.

Since 1975, comedy acts ranging from David Brenner and Henny Youngman to Jay Leno and Jon Stewart have performed at the event. Sandra Bernhard did TV and radio promos for its 1986 season when she was a performer there.  Lewis Black has also become a frequent performer at Summerfest.

Recent performers

Opening headliners

Winterfest 

Beginning in the winter of 1989–1990, Summerfest organizers staged an alternate version of Summerfest, known as Winterfest. Rather than being chiefly set at Henry Maier Festival Park, the event took inspiration from Summerfest's early days and spread its music, comedy, and other events throughout several downtown Milwaukee locations, the central spot being an ice skating rink in Cathedral Square Park. Due largely to undesirable Milwaukee winters, Winterfest was never as profitable as its older summer counterpart, and ceased operations after the 1997-98 event.

See also
Henry Maier Festival Park
List of historic rock festivals

References

External links

 
 Retrospectives by Dave Tianen in the June 24, 2007  and June 28, 2007  Milwaukee Journal Sentinel.

Music festivals in Wisconsin
Rock festivals in the United States
Music of Wisconsin
Festivals in Milwaukee
Recurring events established in 1968
Music festivals established in 1968
Pop music festivals in the United States
Henry Maier Festival Park
1968 establishments in Wisconsin